Mare Insularum  (Latin īnsulārum, the "sea of islands") is a lunar mare located in the Insularum basin just south of the western Mare Imbrium. The basin material is of the Lower Imbrian epoch, with the mare material of the Upper Imbrian epoch. The mare is bordered by the craters Copernicus on the east, and Kepler on the west. Oceanus Procellarum joins the mare to the southwest.

Copernicus is one of the most noticeable craters on the Moon. The rays from both Kepler and Copernicus protrude into the mare. It is located near the crater Fra Mauro, the site of the Apollo 14 landing.  Sinus Aestuum forms a northeastern extension to the mare.

The name was suggested by lunar geologist Don E. Wilhelms.

References

 

Insularum
Insularum